Jaunauce Parish is an administrative unit of Saldus Municipality in the Semigallia region of Latvia.

Towns, villages and settlements of Jaunauce parish

References 

Parishes of Latvia
Saldus Municipality
Semigallia